Matthew Benjamin Kleban is an American theoretical physicist who works on string theory and theoretical cosmology. He is the chair of the Department of Physics and a professor at New York University, former director of the Center for Cosmology and Particle Physics, and a former member of the Institute for Advanced Study. His contributions to physics include:

 The discovery of the first distinct signature of the black hole singularity in AdS/CFT (with Lukasz Fidkowski, Veronika Hubeny and Stephen Shenker)
 Pioneering work on the subtleties of very late-time cosmology in the presence of a positive cosmological constant, and the "Boltzmann brain" problem (with Lisa Dyson and Leonard Susskind)
 A determination of the effects of cosmic bubble collisions on the microwave background radiation and other cosmological observables.
 Work on the fundamental origin of cosmic inflation.
 Demonstrating that theories with multiple axion fields can account for many otherwise mysterious features of our universe.

Selected works

References
 Astronomy magazine cover story on observational signals of the multiverse
 Physics World article on bubble collisions
 Discover Magazine profile of Kleban

External links
 Home page of Matthew Kleban at New York University
 Home page of the Center for Cosmology and Particle Physics

21st-century American physicists
American string theorists
Living people
Stanford University alumni
New York University faculty
1974 births